On 17 May 2022, an airstrike by the Russian Air Force hit a military barracks in Desna, Chernihiv Oblast, Ukraine.

Aftermath
Ukrainian authorities initially reported that eight people had died and twelve were wounded, but updated the casualty count a week later when Volodymyr Zelenskyy said that 87 bodies had been recovered. Russian officials said that the military had used "high-precision, long-range missiles." It was reportedly the largest single loss of life in the Ukrainian military in the 2022 Russian invasion of Ukraine up to that point.

References

Airstrikes during the 2022 Russian invasion of Ukraine
May 2022 events in Ukraine
Airstrikes conducted by Russia
Attacks on military installations in the 2020s
History of Chernihiv Oblast
Northeastern Ukraine campaign